John Roy Van Zant (born February 27, 1959), also known as Johnny Van Zant, is an American singer and the current lead vocalist of Southern rock band Lynyrd Skynyrd. He is the younger brother of Lynyrd Skynyrd co-founder and former lead vocalist Ronnie Van Zant, and of the 38 Special founder Donnie Van Zant.

Biography
During the 1970s, Van Zant performed with his first band, the Austin Nickels Band. They later changed their name to The Johnny Van Zant Band releasing their debut solo album, No More Dirty Deals, in 1980. Early members of the Johnny Van Zant Band consisted of Van Zant on lead vocals, Robbie Gay on guitar, Danny Clausman, on bass, Erik Lundgren on lead guitar, Robbie Morris, drums and Joan Hecht (previously Joan Cusimano) and Nancy Henderson on background vocals. Van Zant released three more solo albums between 1981 and 1985, before taking a break from the music business. 

He became lead vocalist and chief songwriter for the reunited Lynyrd Skynyrd in 1987 and continues to record and perform with them today. He released another solo album, Brickyard Road, in 1990, which featured the popular title track, which was a #1 hit on the U.S. Mainstream Rock Tracks chart for three weeks. He also records and performs with his brother, Donnie, as Van Zant since 1998.  Zant and Lynyrd Skynyrd performed in Arizona on April 9, 2022, during Arizona Bike Week at WestWorld of Scottsdale. He stated that original member Gary Rossington was recovering and still needed prayers.

In May 2006, less than one day before he was to perform at KSAN-FM 107.7 The Bone's Bone Bash 7, Van Zant underwent emergency surgery to have his appendix removed. Treated at Stanford University Medical Center in Palo Alto, California, after reporting pain to a doctor earlier in the day. The incident forced the band to cancel three U.S. shows.

Van Zant is a fan of the Jacksonville Jaguars. He recorded a video, along with remaining members of Lynyrd Skynyrd, that is played at every Jaguars home game on the EverBank Field video board.

According to Skynyrd's website, Van Zant was again hospitalized on August 6, 2011, at the Hennepin County Medical Center in Minneapolis, Minnesota, due to complications from a previous surgery. According to the website, Van Zant had a "surgical site" infected with cellulitus which required both hospitalization and IV/Antibiotic treatment. He began displaying signs of a staph infection and other symptoms related to the infection. His subsequent illness resulted in a number of scheduled performances being cancelled.

Discography

Music videos

References

External links

 Lynyrd Skynyrd website

1960 births
20th-century American singers
21st-century American singers
American male singers
American people of Dutch descent
American rock singers
Living people
Lynyrd Skynyrd members
Musicians from Jacksonville, Florida
Singers from Florida
Van Zant (band) members
Blues rock musicians